Saunders Park is a neighborhood in the West Philadelphia section of Philadelphia, Pennsylvania. It is bounded by Powelton Avenue, 38th Street, Lancaster Avenue, and 40th Street. It is west of Powelton Village and north of Spruce Hill.

It is named for the park at the northeast corner of 39th and Powelton Avenue. The Penn Presbyterian Medical Center is next to the park.

Saunders Park is often considered to be a part of West Powelton, which extends out to 42nd Street.

The neighborhood has participated in planning for its future with the Delaware Valley Regional Planning Commission. The report of that plan is available here.

External links
Saunders Park Shapes Up!, Horticultural Society
Plan Philly description for Saunders Park Neighborhood

Neighborhoods in Philadelphia
West Philadelphia